Hedruris is a genus of nematodes belonging to the family Hedruridae.

The genus has almost cosmopolitan distribution.

Species:
Hedruris androphora 
Hedruris juninensis 
Hedruris miyakoensis 
Hedruris moneiezi 
Hedruris mucronifer 
Hedruris scabra 
Hedruris spinigera 
Hedruris suttonae

References

Nematodes